Raphaël Trémouilhe (27 January 1891 in Allemans-du-Dropt – 12 December 1978) was a French politician. He represented the Democratic and Socialist Union of the Resistance (UDSR) (from 1951 to 1955) and the Radical Party (1956 to 1958) in the National Assembly.

References

1891 births
1978 deaths
People from Lot-et-Garonne
Politicians from Nouvelle-Aquitaine
Democratic and Socialist Union of the Resistance politicians
Radical Party (France) politicians
Deputies of the 2nd National Assembly of the French Fourth Republic
Deputies of the 3rd National Assembly of the French Fourth Republic
French military personnel of World War I
French military personnel of World War II